The Pagan King ( – 'Namejs Ring', initially The King's Ring) is a historical fiction action film directed by  and co-written by Max Kinnings and Grauba. The film stars Edvin Endre, James Bloor, Aistė Diržiūtė and others.

Plot  
The legend of the Namejs Ring is a story that takes place in the 13th century in Semigallia, where the young Namejs (Edvin Endre) becomes the new king after the death of Viesturs (Egons Dombrovskis). The film follows Namejs as he attempts to deal with and repel Christian influence in Semigallia.

Cast

Production 
On 23 March 2014 Grauba and Ēķis presented the idea of a historical fiction movie about freedom fights of Semigallia in 13th century and its leader Namejs. The principal photography of the film began in December 2014 in Cinevilla backlot.

Release  
The film's premier took place on 17 January 2018.

References

External links 
 

2018 films
2018 action drama films
2010s historical films
2010s action war films
British action war films
British action drama films
British epic films
British historical drama films
British war drama films
Northern Crusades films
English-language Latvian films
Latvian drama films
Films about violence
Films directed by Aigars Grauba
Films shot in Latvia
Films set in the 13th century
Historical epic films
British historical action films
War epic films
2010s English-language films
2010s British films